The Bayer designation Delta Tauri (δ Tau, δ Tauri) is shared by three star systems in the constellation Taurus.  They are all members of the Hyades star cluster.

 δ1 Tauri
 δ2 Tauri
 δ3 Tauri

Because they are close to the ecliptic, these stars can be occulted by the Moon and, very rarely, by planets.

References

External links
 Star Names

Tauri, Delta
Taurus (constellation)
Hyades (star cluster)